John Francis Ryde Martin  (8 February 1943–5 January 1999) was a British diplomat.

Biography

Born on 8 February 1943, John Martin was educated at Bedford School and at Brasenose College, Oxford.  He joined the British Diplomatic Service in 1966 and, following diplomatic postings in Argentina, Greece, Cyprus, Nigeria and at the United Nations, he served as British High Commissioner to Malawi between 1993 and 1998.

John Martin died on 5 January 1999.

References

1943 births
1999 deaths
People educated at Bedford School
Alumni of Brasenose College, Oxford
High Commissioners of the United Kingdom to Malawi
Members of HM Diplomatic Service
Companions of the Order of St Michael and St George
20th-century British diplomats